Cielo e Terra is an album by jazz guitarist Al Di Meola that was released in 1985. Airto Moreira plays all percussion on "Traces (of a Tear)", "Cielo e Terra", "When You're Gone", and "Solace".

Track listing 
All songs by Al Di Meola unless otherwise noted.
 "Traces of a Tear" – 7:50
 "Vertigo Shadow" – 3:12
 "Cielo e Terra" – 10:50
 "Enigma of Desire" – 2:43
 "Atavism of Twilight" – 5:16
 "Coral" (Keith Jarrett) – 3:17
 "When You're Gone" – 4:21
 "Etude" – 7:01
 "Solace" – 4:42
Bonus track from 1996 CD release
 "Traces (of a Tear)"  - 8:57

Personnel
Al DiMeola – guitar, synclavier
Airto Moreira – percussion

Chart performance

References

Al Di Meola albums
1985 albums
Manhattan Records albums
Albums recorded at MSR Studios